Atämaz was a Moxel prince of 13th c. He was the son of Kanazor (King) Puresh and brother of Queen Narchat.

War For Kadoma

Erzya-Moksha War

Europe Campaign
In September 1237 the Mongols invaded Moksha kingdom Moxel). Puresh became a vassal of Batu Khan and joined Mongol army in the European campaign. Puresh's warriors became the vanguard of the Mongol army and took part in the seizure of Kiev, Sandomierz and Zawichost.

Massacre before Battle of Legnica 
Puresh secretly met with the High Duke of Poland, Henry II the Pious, on 8 April 1241, one day before the Battle of Legnica, and they agreed that the Moksha army would join the Silesia and Greater Poland. Subutai uncovered the plot. Puresh, his son Atämaz and many Moksha warriors were killed while sleeping after midnight on 9 April 1241.

See also
 Mokshas
 Köten
 Battle of Legnica
 Mongol invasion of Rus'
 Mongol invasion of Europe
 History of Mokshaland
 History of Middle Volga Area

Literature 
 Based on British Library MS Royal 14.C.XIII Fol. 225r-236r and thus ends prematurely.
 Opus Majus, Volume I in the Internet Archive – original text in Latin (including Part IV), ed. by John Henry Bridges, 1900.

Notes

12th-century births
1241 deaths
Assassinated people
13th-century soldiers
Military strategists
People murdered in Poland
Moksha people